The 2018 Norwegian Athletics Championships was the year's national outdoor track and field championships for Norway. It was held from 17–19 August at the Byrkjelo Stadium in Gloppen. The King's trophy was awarded to women's javelin thrower Sigrid Borge and Karsten Warholm, who won both the men's 400 m hurdles and sprint events.

Results

Men

Women

References

Results
 Day 1 Results. NM Byrkjelo 2018. Retrieved 2019-07-14.
 Day 2 Results. NM Byrkjelo 2018. Retrieved 2019-07-14.
 Day 3 Results. NM Byrkjelo 2018. Retrieved 2019-07-14.

External links
 NM Byrkjelo 2018 championships website 

Norwegian Athletics Championships
Norwegian Athletics Championships
Norwegian Athletics Championships
Norwegian Athletics Championships
Gloppen
Sport in Sogn og Fjordane